Annabelle is a 2014 American supernatural horror film directed by  John R. Leonetti, written by Gary Dauberman and produced by Peter Safran and James Wan. It is a prequel to the 2013 film The Conjuring and the second installment in The Conjuring Universe franchise. The film was inspired by a story of a doll named Annabelle told by Ed and Lorraine Warren. The film stars Annabelle Wallis, Ward Horton, and Alfre Woodard.

A spin-off focusing on the origins of the Annabelle doll that was introduced in The Conjuring was announced shortly after The Conjurings release, mainly due to its worldwide box office success and the positive reception towards the depiction of the doll. Principal photography began in January 2014 in Los Angeles.

Annabelle premiered at the TCL Chinese Theatre in Los Angeles on September 29, 2014, and was theatrically released in the United States on October 3, 2014, by Warner Bros. Pictures and New Line Cinema. Annabelle received negative reviews from critics, many of whom felt the film inferior to its predecessor, praise for atmosphere but it was a major box office success, grossing over $257million against its $6.5million production budget. A prequel, titled Annabelle: Creation, was released on August 11, 2017. A sequel, titled Annabelle Comes Home, was released on June 26, 2019.

Plot
In Santa Monica, California, John Form, a doctor, presents his expectant wife Mia with a rare vintage porcelain doll as a gift for their first child to be placed in a collection of dolls in their daughter's nursery.

That night, the couple is disturbed by the sounds of their next door neighbors, the Higgins, being murdered during a home invasion. While Mia calls the police, she and John are attacked by the Higgins' killers. The police arrive and shoot one killer, a man, dead while the female killer kills herself by slitting her throat inside the nursery while holding the doll. News reports identify the assailants as the Higgins' estranged daughter, Annabelle, and her unidentified boyfriend, both members of a cult.

In the days following the attack, a series of paranormal activities occur around the Forms' residence. Afterwards, Mia gives birth to a healthy baby girl. She and John name their child Leah. The family rents an apartment in Pasadena and, after finding the doll that John had discarded since Annabelle's previous attack in one of their boxes, another set of paranormal events plague Mia and her daughter. 

Mia calls back Detective Clarkin to gather information about Annabelle and the cultists and learns that the cult intends to summon a demonic spirit. With the help of bookseller and fellow tenant Evelyn, Mia realizes that the cult practiced devil worship, which summoned a demon who followed the family after they moved to their apartment so as to claim a soul. Upon returning home, Mia and Leah are attacked by the demon who reveals itself while manipulating the doll. Mia and John contact their parish priest, Father Perez, who informs them that demons sometimes attach themselves to inanimate objects as an advantage to accomplish their goals and that a human soul must be offered for a purpose. Without any hopes of exorcising the demon out of the doll, Father Perez decides to take it away to seek help from the Warrens for investigation. But before he can enter the church, the demon impersonating Annabelle's spirit attacks him and grabs the doll.

Father Perez is hospitalized the next day and, when John checks on him, the priest warns him  that after sensing its powerful presence, the demon's true intention is to claim Mia's soul. That night, while Evelyn is visiting Mia, the demon uses Father Perez's physical form to sneak into the apartment and abduct Leah for her mother's soul. To spare her daughter, Mia attempts to jump out of the window with the doll but John arrives in time along with Evelyn to stop her. Evelyn decides to take her life in Mia's place instead as atonement for causing a car accident that resulted in the death of her daughter Ruby years ago. As Evelyn lies dead on the road, the demon and the doll disappear. Mia and John never saw or heard of the doll again and Leah is safely inside her crib.

Six months later, the doll is bought from an antique shop by a mother as a gift for her daughter Debbie, a nursing student, and is seen stored and locked away into a glass case in the Warren's artifact room.

Cast

Production

Development
The film is a spin-off of the 2013 horror film The Conjuring, focusing on the origins of the Annabelle doll found in that film. The film was designed to be stand alone yet collectively catering to fans of The Conjuring who would already be familiar with the latter film. To Backstage.com, the film was one of the first in a new strategy by distributors Warner Bros. and New Line Cinema "that capitalizes on the built-in fan bases for successful films, allowing for smaller budgets and production time with a bigger payout on the back end."

Casting
Casting was announced in January 2014, with Annabelle Wallis and Ward Horton playing the lead roles. with actors Eric Ladin, Brian Howe and Alfre Woodard also being announced that month.

Filming
Principal photography began on January 27, 2014, at The Book Shop in Covina, California. On February 25, 2014, filming continued at an apartment on  South Normandie Avenue in Los Angeles County, where the 55-member crew shot for several days. Director Leonetti and producer Safran told reporters that the Annabelle set was "haunted" and that they thought "supernatural phenomena" had occurred there. The film was shot in sequence so that the actors were always aware of their emotional arcs.

Music
On April 24, 2014, Joseph Bishara was hired to compose the music for the film. WaterTower Music released the soundtrack album on September 30, 2014.

Reception

Box office
Annabelle grossed $84.3million in North America and $172.8 million in other territories, for a worldwide total of $257million, against a production budget of $6.5million. In the United States and Canada, Annabelle is the fourteenth highest-grossing horror/supernatural film.

Early tracking projected Annabelle would gross around $25–27million in its opening weekend. However, estimates declined shortly after to a range between $20–22million. Annabelle was released on October 3, 2014, in 3,185 theatres in North America. It topped the box office in its opening day earning $15.4million (including its $2.1million midnight previews). In its traditional three-day opening the film debuted at #2 at the box office with $37.1million, at an average of $11,659 per theater from 3,185 theaters after a neck-and-neck competition against Gone Girl that earned $37.5million. The two releases were separated by $378,854. Its opening weekend gross is the eleventh highest in October and the biggest for a horror genre film of 2014, surpassing The Purge: Anarchys $28.9million opening. Dan Fellman, president of domestic distribution at Warner Bros., said about the opening box office performance, "we had a wonderful campaign for the film and a good date"; she added "being a spinoff of The Conjuring set it up really well and we just hit the right note." It is the second time that an October weekend has produced two $30million or more debuts; the first was in 2008: High School Musical 3 ($42million) and Saw V ($31million). To Rentrak, the opening weekend crowd was evenly split between females with 51% and under 25 years with 54%. The film's theatrical run ended on December 18, 2014, and it earned a total of $84million, becoming the thirty-fifth highest-grossing movie of 2014 in the US.

The film was released in Russia on September 26, 2014, a week prior to its wide release and earned $2.1million on its opening weekend, debuting at No. 3 at the Russian box office. Overseas, in its opening weekend the film earned $23.6million from nearly 3,300 screen and 39 foreign markets for a first-weekend worldwide total of $60.8million.

High openings of Annabelle internationally were reported in France ($3.4million), Brazil ($3million), the UK ($3.1million), Argentina ($1.2million), Spain ($1.45million) and Germany ($1.14million). In India Annabelle debuted at #2 behind Bollywood blockbuster Bang Bang! and collected $1.3million. It set an all-time opening record for a horror film in Peru with $1.34million which is also Warner Bros. second biggest opening weekend of all time there overall. In Mexico, the film earned $10.9million (including previews) on its opening weekend and broke the record for the biggest debut ever for a horror movie, and the best 2D opening. Its opening weekend gross is also the third-biggest opening overall of 2014 behind Maleficent and Transformers: Age of Extinction there. In total, the film took 59% of the total market share.

As of October 13, 2014, Annabelle has become the highest-grossing horror film in the Philippines, earning over ₱121.33million. The film surpassed Insidious: Chapter 2s record (₱113million), doing so after 12 days of release. The film has also become the highest-grossing horror movie in Lebanon after staying atop the box office for two weekends.

Critical response
Annabelle received generally negative reviews from critics, many of whom felt the film inferior to its predecessor. The review aggregator website Rotten Tomatoes reports an approval rating of 28% based on 137 reviews, with an average rating of 4.50/10. The site's critical consensus reads, "Annabelle borrows unabashedly from better horror films, content to leave viewers with a string of cheap jolts that fail to build on the far more effective The Conjuring." On Metacritic, the film has a weighted average score of 37 out of 100, based on 27 critics, indicating "generally unfavorable reviews". Audiences polled by CinemaScore gave the film a grade of "B" on an A+ to F scale.

Frank Scheck of The Hollywood Reporter criticized the film for its cheap production and screenplay, but was positive towards the performances of the cast and saying, "the film is ultimately so scary and formulaic that you won't forget it."

Scott Foundas of Variety gave the film a positive review, calling the film "inspired" but periodically cheap. He added "a cut-rate spinoff from James Wan's superlative haunted-house hit The Conjuring that (partly) makes up in crude shock effects, but lacks in atmosphere. Designed mainly as a starring vehicle for the eponymous, creepy-as-hell doll (who easily outclasses her human co-stars), this WB/New Line quickie is the thirst of die-hard genre fans and is by the far the best horror movie of the year".

Pete Hammond of Deadline gave the film a positive review and said that the scary doll show has left him pining for Chucky in Child's Play. He further added, "Annabelle may still draw horror fans in this Halloween month, and they will be quaking over the scares in this film."

Accolades

Home video 
In January 20, 2015 was released in DVD and Blu-ray by Warner Home Video. In May 31, 2022 was released alongside another The Conjuring Universe movies in Blu-ray, excluding The Curse of Llorona.

Future

Prequel 

In October 2014, Fellman told The Washington Post that the studio was considering a series based on the film, with a sequel already in the works. In October 2015, it was reported that Gary Dauberman would be returning to write the script. On March 22, 2016, Warner Bros. slated the film for release on May 19, 2017, with Lights Out director David F. Sandberg directing the film.

In June 2016, Miranda Otto and Stephanie Sigman were cast to star in the prequel. The story centers on a dollmaker, and his wife (Otto) whose daughter tragically dies. Twelve years later they decide to open their home to a nun (Sigman) and several girls from a shuttered orphanage. When the dollmaker's possessed creation Annabelle sets her sights on the children, it turns their shelter into a storm of horror.

Sequel 

In April 2018, Warner Bros. announced July 3, 2019, as the release date for an as-yet untitled new film in The Conjuring franchise. Later that month, it was announced that the film would be a third Annabelle film, with Gary Dauberman signed on to write and direct, in his directorial debut. James Wan and Peter Safran would co-produce the project. The film's title, Annabelle Comes Home, was revealed in March 2019. In May 2019, the film's release date was changed to June 26, 2019.

Popular culture/Short film
On October 27, 2021, Warner Bros C.E.O. Jason Kilar announced a YouTube video titled "Annabelle in Quarantine". The short film follows Annabelle in the Warner Bros. headquarters while bored in quarantine.

References

External links
 
 
 
 
 

2014 films
2014 horror films
2010s pregnancy films
2010s supernatural horror films
American pregnancy films
American supernatural horror films
Demons in film
Film spin-offs
Films about haunted dolls
Films about Satanism
Films about sentient toys
Films directed by John R. Leonetti
Films produced by Peter Safran
Films produced by James Wan
Films scored by Joseph Bishara
Films set in 1967
Films set in 1968
Films set in apartment buildings
Films set in Santa Monica, California
Films set in Pasadena, California
Films shot in Los Angeles
Films with screenplays by Gary Dauberman
Murder–suicide in films
The Conjuring Universe
2010s English-language films
Dune Entertainment films
New Line Cinema films
Warner Bros. films
Horror films about toys
2010s American films
American prequel films